Robert Neumaier (14 April 1885 – 22 March 1959) was a German international footballer.

References

1885 births
1959 deaths
Association football defenders
German footballers
Germany international footballers